Tina Rahimi is an Australian boxer. She participated in the 2022 Commonwealth Games and won Bronze Medal in the Women's Featherweight Division. She is one of the first Australian Muslim women boxers.

References 

Australian women boxers
Boxers at the 2022 Commonwealth Games
Commonwealth Games bronze medallists for Australia
1996 births
Living people
Commonwealth Games medallists in boxing
Medallists at the 2022 Commonwealth Games